Inter de Querétaro Fútbol Club is a Mexican professional football team based in Querétaro City, Querétaro, Mexico that plays in Liga Premier de México.

History 
The team was founded in August 2020 with the name change of the Real Querétaro, team that competed in the Liga TDP and whose place was occupied by the new club, however, for administrative reasons the team officially played with the name of the previous club.

On January 23, 2021, Azores de Hidalgo announced its withdrawal from the Liga Premier de México due to institutional problems, in addition, the Azores board of directors returned the license to Real Zamora owners, who agreed to start a new project with Inter de Querétaro, so the Querétaro team used the place in the league, however, officially the team was called Azores de Hidalgo for the rest of the season. Inter made their Liga Premier debut on January 30, 2021, losing 4–1 to Pioneros de Cancún.

At the end of January 2021 it was announced that the team got a second team in the Liga TDP after signing an agreement with the Club Fundadores, the new squad was called Inter Fundadores. On July 30, 2021, Inter de Querétaro obtained its own official registration in the Liga Premier and Liga TDP. 

In September 2021 the club got a third team in the Liga TDP, which became known as Inter Aicesa SJR, playing in San Juan del Río, Querétaro, In December 2021 the team was withdrawn from San Juan del Río due to problems between the board and the players, the team was relocated to Querétaro City and renamed as Inter San Pablo, however, the team has always been officially called C.D. Querétaro 3D.

Stadium 

The Estadio Olímpico de Querétaro, also called Estadio Olímpico Alameda, is a multi-use stadium in Querétaro City, Querétaro, Mexico.  It is currently used mostly for football matches and athletics. The stadium has a capacity of 4,600 people, was opened in 1939 and renovated in 2021.

The team also plays some of its matches at the Unidad Deportiva La Cañada, a sports complex that has a soccer stadium which has an approximate capacity for 2,000 people. This field is located at El Marqués, Querétaro, a town that is part of the metropolitan area of Querétaro.

Players

First-team squad

Reserve teams
Inter de Querétaro F.C. (Liga TDP)
Reserve team that plays in the Liga TDP, the fourth level of the Mexican league system.

Inter Fundadores (Liga TDP)
Reserve team that plays in the Liga TDP, the fourth level of the Mexican league system.

Inter San Pablo (Liga TDP)
Reserve team that plays in the Liga TDP, the fourth level of the Mexican league system.

References

External Links 
Liga MX Profile

Football clubs in Querétaro
Association football clubs established in 2020
2020 establishments in Mexico
Liga Premier de México